Glenn Laurence Dods (born 17 November 1958 in Whanganui) was a successful New Zealand association football player who represented the New Zealand national football team 22 times from 1976 to the 1982.

He was part of the All Whites squad that took part in the 1982 FIFA World Cup finals, playing against both USSR and Brazil.   

Dods was appointed the Football Director at Adelaide City FC in May 2019.

Club history
• Fitzroy AFC 

•  New Plymouth Boys' High School XI 

• 1972 - New Plymouth United 

• 1973 - Moturoa United

• 1974 - Mt Wellington AFC

• 1978 - Blockhouse Bay

• 1979 - 1984 - Adelaide City

References

External links

1957 births
Living people
New Zealand association footballers
1982 FIFA World Cup players
New Zealand international footballers
Association football physiotherapists
Association football defenders
Moturoa AFC players
Expatriate sportspeople in Australia